Nikolaos Baltatzis-Mavrokordatos (born 1898, date of death unknown) was a Greek water polo player. He competed at the 1920 Summer Olympics and the 1924 Summer Olympics. He was also a politician, and was elected to the Greek parliament as a member of the People's Party in 1936.

See also
 Greece men's Olympic water polo team records and statistics
 List of men's Olympic water polo tournament goalkeepers

References

External links
 

1897 births
Year of death missing
Water polo goalkeepers
Greek male water polo players
Olympic water polo players of Greece
Water polo players at the 1920 Summer Olympics
Water polo players at the 1924 Summer Olympics
Water polo players from Athens
Ethnikos Piraeus Water Polo Club players
People's Party (Greece) politicians